The Design Exchange (DX) is a Canadian event venue. It is located in Toronto's financial district in the historical Toronto Stock Exchange building, that was incorporated into a skyscraper in 1991, the Toronto-Dominion Centre (222 Bay Street). The organisation operated a design museum, but this museum was closed in 2019. Since 2017, it hosts a biennial design festival, the Expo for Design, Innovation & Technology (EDIT).

History 

The federal agency Design Canada closed in 1985, followed by the University of Toronto's (soon rescinded) announcement in 1986 that its school of architecture was to be shut down. In 1983 the Toronto Stock Exchange moved out of 234 Bay Street, which was a designated heritage property since 1978. Olympia and York (O&Y) purchased the building.

A study commissioned by O&Y indicated that there was support for using the building as a cultural design centre. Advocates of this proposal gathered in January 1986 to lobby the city government, and the city recognized ten of them as "The Group for the Creation of a Design Centre in Toronto", which legally became an organization in 1987 and later became the Design Exchange organization. A study launched by the city found that the proposal was "both possible and desirable".

The Bay Street property was sold in 1986, to Cadillac Fairview and the Toronto Dominion Bank, but O&Y required that the design centre idea would be kept. The new owner had to pay the city $500,000 a year to use for running the centre. This centre was named the Design Exchange in 1988 and control of it was handed to the citizens' group which had advocated for it.

In 1996 a permanent collection was established. DX held exhibitions and also organized educational programs and design awards. In March 2012 the Design Exchange came under the directorship of Shauna Levy, and began to operate exclusively as a design museum. In 2015, DX was organizing exhibitions in other locations, such as Smarter.Faster.Tougher., an exhibition about the design of sportswear.

In 2017, the Design Exchange launched a 10-day festival called Expo for Design, Innovation & Technology (EDIT), in partnership with the United Nations Development Programme. The festival was held in East Harbour, an old soap factory.

In 2019, the DX gave Razor Suleman the position of chief executive officer (CEO), effective immediately. The Design Exchange's collection was deaccessioned in the same year, with the institution ceasing operation of its design museum. The closure of the museum saw the Design Exchange's efforts reoriented towards the biennial EDIT event.

See also
 Industrial design

References

External links

Museums in Toronto
Art museums and galleries in Ontario
Design museums
PATH (Toronto)
Art museums established in 1994
1994 establishments in Ontario
KPMB Architects buildings